The peach blossom, Thyatira batis, is a moth in the family Drepanidae.

Peach Blossom may also refer to:
 Euthyatira pudens, a moth in the family Drepanidae
 Peach blossom, flowers of the peach tree, Prunus persica
 Peach Blossom Island, an island
 Peach Blossoms, a candy
 Princess Peach's Final Smash in Super Smash Bros.
 Peach Blossom (My Little Pony), a fictional character
 Peach Blossom (film), a 1945 Mexican film